Syntypistis nigribasalis is a species of moth of the family Notodontidae first described by Wileman in 1910. It is found in Taiwan, Vietnam, Thailand, Indonesia, Malaysia and the Chinese provinces of Zhejiang, Fujian, Jiangxi, Guangxi and Guizhou.

References

Moths described in 1910
Notodontidae